Brashear is an unincorporated community located on Interstate Highway 30 and Farm to Market Road 2653 in west central  Hopkins County, Texas, United States. Brashear has a post office (with the ZIP code 75420), church, farm buildings, a radio building, and other buildings.

History to present
Brashear was founded in 1868, and it was named for Joseph Brashear, who surveyed the townsite with settlement and foundation. The area was part of the Wise Ranch in 1898, when G. W. Mahoney bought the ranch, divided it into small farms, laid out the townsite, and donated land for a school, a church, and a cemetery. A post office was established at Brashear in 1899, with W. G. Crain as postmaster. A school opened the same year, and in 1905 it had an enrollment of 149.

By 1914, the town had Baptist, Christian, and Methodist churches, a bank, a newspaper, a telegraph connection, and a reported population of 400. Its population was estimated at 300 in the mid-1920s and 350 in the late 1940s. In 1948 the town had six stores, four churches, a two-teacher school, and a cotton gin.

The population declined during the 1960s to 280 and continued to be reported at that level in 1990 and 2000. In the late 1980s, Brashear had four churches, a factory, a post office, and a number of scattered houses.

Geography

Climate
Brashear is considered to be part of the humid subtropical region.

Demographics
As of 2000, and present, the population is unknown. But from census (according to MCDC and its demographic page of Brashear, Texas) of 2000, the population density was 28.2 people per square mile. And the racial make-up of the community was 91.9% White, 0.4% African American, 1.1% Native American, 6.4% from other races, and 0.3% two or more races. Hispanic or Latino of any race were 8.6% of the population.

Transportation
Brashear is served by two highways that run through the city, and three farm-to-market roads:

  Interstate 30
  State Highway 19
 Farm to Market Road 1567
 Farm-to-Market Road 2653
 Farm to Market Road 275 South

Education
Education for students in Brashear is provided through eight school districts in the area: Greenville, Commerce, Campbell, Lone Oak, Cumby, Miller Grove, Sulphur Springs and Emory.

Colleges and universities near Brashear 

Brashear is in the higher educational services area of six colleges and/or universities from Commerce, Sulphur Springs, Paris, Mount Pleasant, and Tyler:

 Texas A&M University-Commerce
 Sulphur Springs Technical
 Paris Junior College
 Northeast Texas Community College
 Tyler Junior College
 University of Texas at Tyler

References

External links
 

Unincorporated communities in Hopkins County, Texas
Unincorporated communities in Texas